Matas Maldeikis (born 1980) is a Lithuanian politician.
Matas Maldeikis' father Eugenijus Maldeikis and mother Aušra Maldeikienė have both served on the Seimas.

He was elected to the Seimas for the first time in 2020, via the Homeland Union party list. While serving on the Seimas, Maldeikis chaired the Lithuanian Parliamentary Group for Relations with Taiwan.

References

1980 births
Living people
21st-century Lithuanian politicians
Homeland Union politicians
Members of the Seimas